P. gigantea may refer to:
 Pachyaena gigantea, an extinct mammal species in the genus Pachyaena
 Panthea gigantea, a moth species found in western North America
 Petalura gigantea, the giant dragonfly or south-eastern petaltail, one of the world's largest dragonflies
 Phalaenopsis gigantea, an orchid species endemic to Borneo
 Pinguicula gigantea, a tropical carnivorous plant species native to Mexico
 Pleuroploca gigantea (= Triplofusus papillosus), the Florida horse conch, a species of extremely large predatory subtropical and tropical sea snail
 Pouteria gigantea, a plant species endemic to Ecuador
 Pseudaneitea gigantea, an air-breathing land slug species
 Pseudibis gigantea, the giant ibis, a bird species
 Pseudoeurycea gigantea, a salamander species endemic to Mexico

See also
 Gigantea (disambiguation)